Stanley "Stan" Vincent Pepperell (birth registered fourth ¼ 1914 – 1985), also known by the nickname of "Pep" , was an English professional rugby league footballer who played in the 1930s and 1940s.

Background
Stan Pepperell's birth was registered in Seaton district, Cumberland, England, and he later lived with Douglas Clark and his family during his time playing for Huddersfield, and afterwards when he worked for the Clark's coal merchant business.

Playing career

Club career
Pepperell changed from amateur to professional rugby league when he transferred from Seaton ARLFC to Huddersfield during 1934. He spent his entire professional career with the club, appearing 280 times and scoring 508 points.

International honours
Pepperell won caps for England while at Huddersfield in 1936 against Wales, in 1937 against France, and in 1944 against Wales.

County honours
Pepperell represented Cumberland. Stan Pepperell played right-, i.e. number 3, in Cumberland's 5-4 victory over Australia in the 1948–49 Kangaroo tour of Great Britain and France match at the Recreation Ground, Whitehaven on Wednesday 13 October 1948, in front of a crowd of 8,818.

County Cup Final appearances
Pepperell played  in Huddersfield's 18–10 victory over Hull F.C. in the 1938 Yorkshire County Cup Final during the 1938–39 season at Odsal Stadium, Bradford on Saturday 22 October 1938.

Testimonial match
Pepperell's Testimonial match at Huddersfield took place in 1947.

Genealogical Information
Stanley Pepperell was the older brother of the rugby league footballers; Russell Pepperell and Albert Pepperell.

References

1914 births
1985 deaths
Cumberland rugby league team players
England national rugby league team players
English rugby league players
Huddersfield Giants players
Place of death missing
Rugby league centres
Rugby league five-eighths
Rugby league players from Seaton, Cumbria
Rugby league wingers